Kabaman is a village on the south-west coast of New Ireland, Papua New Guinea, south of Kait and north of Lamassa. The people speak the Siar-Lak language. It is located in Konoagil Rural LLG.

References

Populated places in New Ireland Province